Jason Michael Weaver (born July 18, 1979) is an American actor and singer best known for his roles as Marcus Henderson on The WB sitcom Smart Guy, Jerome Turrell on the short-lived sitcom Thea from 1993 to 1994, and the pre-teenaged Michael Jackson on the 1992  miniseries The Jacksons: An American Dream., which originally both aired on ABC. He was also the singing voice of the young Simba in Walt Disney Feature Animation's 1994 film The Lion King. He was featured on Chingy's 2004 hit single "One Call Away", which peaked at number 2 on the Billboard Hot 100. He played Teddy in the 2006 hit movie ATL.

Career

Acting career
One of Weaver's earliest acting roles was on Oprah Winfrey's 1990 television series Brewster Place. He went on to portray a young Michael Jackson in the 1992 miniseries The Jacksons: An American Dream, and starred on the television sitcoms Thea (1993–1994) and Smart Guy (1997–1999). In 1994, he provided the singing voice of young Simba in Disney's animated feature film The Lion King.

In 2002, Weaver appeared in Drumline with Nick Cannon, followed by a role in The Ladykillers in 2004. In 2004, he also was a featured artist in the song "One Call Away", as well as in the music video that also starred Keshia Knight Pulliam and AND1 baller Phillip "Hot Sauce" Champion. In 2006, Weaver was featured in a supporting role in the film ATL starring rappers T.I. and Big Boi from OutKast. He also appeared as an extra in the music video "Rock Yo Hips" by Crime Mob featuring Lil Scrappy and "Make Up Bag" by The-Dream featuring T.I. In 2011, he starred in the film He's Mine Not Yours alongside Caryn Ward, Wendy Raquel Robinson, Carl Anthony Payne II and Clifton Powell.

Focus on music
Weaver is also a recording artist. He provided vocals for his role as Michael Jackson in The Jacksons: An American Dream and as the singing voice of the cub Simba in Disney's 1994 animated feature film The Lion King.

His debut album, Love Ambition, was released on Motown Records on June 27, 1995. He released two versions of the song "Stay With Me".

In 2003, he collaborated with hip-hop rapper Chingy on the track "One Call Away". The single was a Top 5 hit single in the United States.

Personal life
Jason is son of Marilyn “Kitty” Haywood and Robert Lincoln Weaver. His mother is the key member of the Chicago-based female vocal group Kitty & the Haywoods, who backed with the late Aretha Franklin on the soundtrack album to the 1970s film Sparkle. As a father, Weaver has one son named Jaylen. Jason studied at Thornwood High School.

Discography

Albums
 1995: Love Ambition
 1996: Stay with Me (EP)
 1996: Stay with Me (second unreleased album)

Singles
"I Wanna Be Where You Are" (1992)
"Love Ambition (Call on Me)" (1995)
"I Can't Stand the Pain" (1995)
"Stay with Me" (1996)
"One Call Away" (Chingy featuring J-Weav) (2004)

Filmography

Film

Television

Awards and nominations

References

External links

1979 births
Living people
Male actors from Chicago
African-American male actors
African-American male child actors
American male child actors
American child singers
American male film actors
American male pop singers
American contemporary R&B singers
Motown artists
American male television actors
20th-century American singers
21st-century American singers
20th-century American male actors
21st-century American male actors
20th-century American male singers
21st-century American male singers
20th-century African-American male singers
21st-century African-American male singers